Thimingalam is a 1983 Indian Malayalam film, directed by Crossbelt Mani. The film stars Shankar, Balan K. Nair, K. P. Ummer and K. R. Vijaya in the lead roles. The film has musical score by G. Devarajan.

Cast

Shankar as Vijayan
Balan K. Nair as Kurup
K. P. Ummer as Menon
K. R. Vijaya as Devamma
Kuthiravattam Pappu as Sankarankutty
Raveendran as Venu
Lalu Alex as Gopan
Poojappura Ravi as Chacko
Bheeman Raghu as Peter
Manochithra as Reetha
Sukumari as Bhanumathi
Devi as Rosily
Sunanda as Anitha
V. D. Rajappan as Union Secretary

Soundtrack
The music was composed by G. Devarajan and the lyrics were written by Chunakkara Ramankutty.

References

External links
 

1983 films
1980s Malayalam-language films